Bengal Central Bank was a commercial bank based in Bengal. It was founded by J. C. Das in 1918 as the Bengal Central Loan Company. On 18 December 1950, it merged with Comilla Banking Corporation, Comilla Union Bank and Hooghly Bank to form the United Bank of India.

Currently it is part of Punjab National Bank

References 

Defunct banks of India
Banks established in 1918
Banks disestablished in 1950
Bengal Presidency
Indian companies established in 1918
Indian companies disestablished in 1950